The Family Computer Emulator was one of the first Famicom emulators. The development started in the early 1990s.

It was made by Haruhisa Udagawa(宇田川 治久), a developer at Namco, Sonic Team and KAZe. He also worked on twelve games from the 1980s to the early 2000s.

The emulator was simple, but it was able to run games such as Donkey Kong.  The ROM files had to be dumped through a complicated process.

Supported games 
Udagawa only tested a few games on his Famicom Emulator, those games being:
 Xevious
 Famicom Tennis
 Mario Bros.
 Donkey Kong
 Space Invaders

Limitations 
The emulator could not do sound emulation, and did not support the Famicom's microphone. The ROM had to be 256 kilobits, and the Graphics Tile Data file had to be 64 kilobits. (They had their own memory space. This was before the iNES format was created). Sprites had to be 8 pixels by 8 pixels 

The CPU emulation was slow

See also 
Nesticle, another Nintendo Entertainment System Emulator

References 

Nintendo Entertainment System emulators
Discontinued software